The episcopate of the country is the Episcopal Conference of Rwanda (French: Conférence Episcopal du Rwanda, CEPR) that was established on June 6, 1980; previously existed the Assemble Bishops of Rwanda.

The conference is a member of the Association of Episcopal Conferences of Central Africa (ACEAC) and Symposium of Episcopal Conferences of Africa and Madagascar (SECAM).

List of presidents of the Bishops' Conference:

1980-1983: Vincent Nsengiyumva, Archbishop of Kigali

1983-1991: Joseph Ruzindana, Bishop of Byumba

1991-1994: Vincent Nsengiyumva, Archbishop of Kigali

1999-2003: Thaddée Ntihinyurwa, archbishop of Kigali

2003-2010: Alexis Habiyambere, bishop of Nyundo

from 2010: Smaragde Mbonyintege, bishop of Kabgayi

External links
 http://www.eglisecatholiquerwanda.org/
 http://www.gcatholic.org/dioceses/country/RW.htm
 http://www.catholic-hierarchy.org/country/rw.html

Rwanda
Catholic Church in Rwanda

it:Chiesa cattolica in Ruanda#Conferenza_episcopale